Colourgrade is the second studio album by British musician Tirzah. It was released through Domino on 1 October 2021.

Accolades

Track listing

Personnel
 Tirzah – primary artist, design
 Mica Levi – production, mixing , engineering
 Coby Sey – featured artist, 
 Kwake Bass – production , engineering
 Dean Blunt – production 
 Kwes – mixing 
 Heba Kadry – mastering
 Leah Walker – photography, design
 Matthew Cooper – design

Charts

References

External links
 

2021 albums
Tirzah (musician) albums
Domino Recording Company albums